The Cornelius Lawrence Clancy House is a historic house in Memphis, Tennessee. It was built in 1900 for Cornelius Lawrence Clancy, his wife née Julia Pelegrin, and their nine children. Clancy was a grocer and real estate investor who served as a magistrate on the Shelby County Court.

The house was designed in the Queen Anne architectural style. It has been listed on the National Register of Historic Places since November 25, 1983.

References

Houses on the National Register of Historic Places in Tennessee
National Register of Historic Places in Shelby County, Tennessee
Queen Anne architecture in Tennessee
Houses completed in 1900